Asok Ray is a mechanical engineer, an applied mathematician, and Distinguished Professor of Mechanical Engineering and Mathematics at the Pennsylvania State University. He has published in numerous academic and scientific journals. His contributions to the fields of signal processing, machine learning, and estimation were focused on anomaly detection and statistical pattern recognition based on the theories of symbolic dynamics, and statistical mechanics.

References

External links 
Asok Ray profile at Pennsylvania State University

Year of birth missing (living people)
Living people

Pennsylvania State University faculty